William Wrey may refer to:
 Sir William Wrey, 1st Baronet, High Sheriff of Cornwall in 1598
 Sir William Wrey, 2nd Baronet, MP for Liskeard, Cornwall in 1624

See also
 William Wray (disambiguation)